This is a list of notable alumni of Connecticut College.

Literature and poetry

 Michael Collier ('76): Poet Laureate of Maryland, 2001–2004; Director of The Bread Loaf Writers' Conference, Middlebury College
 Dobby Gibson ('93): poet
 Aracelis Girmay ('99): poet
 Cecelia Holland ('65): novelist
 Gayl Jones ('72): novelist, poet, playwright
 William Lychack ('88): novelist
 Luanne Rice ('77): novelist

Publishing
 Sloane Crosley ('00): best-selling author; essayist; publicist with Vintage Books
 David Grann ('89): journalist and best-selling and staff writer at The New Yorker
 Joshua Green ('94): senior national correspondent at Bloomberg Businessweek and a weekly columnist for the Boston Globe
 Jazmine Hughes ('12): writer and editor; currently a story editor at The New York Times Magazine
 Nan Kempner ('52): socialite, contributing editor of Vogue
 Elizabeth Peer ('57): journalist; first female foreign bureau chief at Newsweek
 A. B. Stoddard ('89): journalist, political commentator, associate editor of The Hill

Academia
 Edward Burger ('85): professor of mathematics, Williams College
 Martha Chen: lecturer in public policy, Harvard Kennedy School
 Cynthia Enloe ('60): research professor of international relations and women's studies, Clark University
 Haden Guest ('93): Director of the Harvard Film Archive, and lecturer at Harvard University
 David Haussler ('75): professor at University of California, Santa Cruz, member of National Academy of Sciences and American Academy of Arts and Sciences
 Mark Samuels Lasner: Senior Research Fellow at the University of Delaware
 Shelley Taylor ('68): social psychologist, pioneer in health psychology, winner of Distinguished Scientific Contribution Award from APA
 Roxanne Johnson: Chemist working at United States Environmental Protection Agency
 Ellen Vitetta ('64): Director, Cancer Immunobiology Center, University of Texas Southwestern Medical Center National Acad. Sciences; Institute of Medicine; American Acad. Arts and Sciences

Design, art, and art history
 Agnes Gund: philanthropist, art patron and collector, advocate for arts education
 Christine Y. Kim: associate curator of contemporary art at Los Angeles County Museum of Art; former associate curator at the Studio Museum in Harlem
 Peter Som ('93): fashion designer, winner of the 2002 Ecco Domani Fashion Foundation prize
 Marcia Tucker: first female curator of the Whitney Museum; founding director of the New Museum of Contemporary Art

Television and radio
 H. Jon Benjamin: actor, comedian and writer best known for his voice-over roles
 Molly Cheek ('73): It's Garry Shandling's Show
 Lee Eisenberg ('99): writer and producer for The Office and the film Year One
 Chris Gifford (actor) ('81): Co-creator of the Peabody Award-winning children's series "Dora the Explorer"
 Scott Lowell: actor, Queer as Folk
 Leland Orser ('82): actor
 Christof Putzel ('01): award-winning journalist and correspondent for Al Jazeera America
 Joan Rivers: actress, comedian; attended CC briefly, then transferred to Barnard College
 Susan Saint James: actress, Kate & Allie; attended CC, did not graduate
 Sam Seder: writer, actor, political commentator, radio host on Air America
 Alec Sulkin ('95) and Wellesley Wild ('94): writers and executive producers on Family Guy, The Orville and the 85th Academy Awards

Film, theater and dance
 Ted Chapin ('72): President and executive director, Rodgers and Hammerstein Organization
 Charles Chun ('90): actor who has appeared in television shows such as Criminal Minds, Scrubs, Everybody Loves Raymond, Ned's Declassified School Survival Guide and How I Met Your Mother
 Chrystelle Trump Bond: dancer, choreographer, author, and dance historian
 David Dorfman (MFA '81): Professor of Dance, chair of Dance Department, choreographer of modern dance
 Sean Fine ('96): winner of Academy Award for Best Documentary (Short Subject) for Inocente; director of Academy Award-nominated feature documentary War/Dance
 Jeffrey Finn ('92): Broadway producer, nominated for 2005 Tony Award for Best Revival of a Play for On Golden Pond
 Judy Irving ('68): Emmy Award and Sundance-winning filmmaker 
 Raja Feather Kelly ('09): American dancer and choreographer and serves as the artistic director of the New Brooklyn Theatre
 Leland Orser ('82) Actor and director known for Taken, Taken 2 and Se7en
 Estelle Parsons ('49): stage, film, and television actor; winner of 1967 Academy Award for Best Supporting Actress for Bonnie and Clyde
 Kevin Wade ('76): screenwriter, Working Girl, Meet Joe Black

National Theater Institute alumni (accredited by Connecticut College)
 Greg Allen
 Emily Bergl
 Adam Bock (The Receptionist)
 Gordon Clapp (NYPD Blue)
 Jack Coleman (Heroes)
 Rachel Dratch (SNL)
 Chris Elliott (SNL)
 Paul Hodes
 Kristina Klebe
 John Krasinski (The Office)
 Jeremy Piven (Grosse Point Blank, PCU)
 Michael Portnoy
 Sam Robards
 Kate Robin (Six Feet Under)
 Mark Teschner

Music
 Sean Greenhalgh ('01): member of indie rock band Clap Your Hands Say Yeah
 Robbie Guertin ('02): member of indie rock band Clap Your Hands Say Yeah 
 Vance Gilbert ('79): singer-songwriter, folk musician
 Chris Harford: singer, songwriter
 Alec Ounsworth ('00): member of indie rock band Clap Your Hands Say Yeah
 Lee Sargent ('00): member of indie rock band Clap Your Hands Say Yeah 
 Tyler Sargent ('00): member of indie rock band Clap Your Hands Say Yeah
 Henrik Takkenberg ('90): musician, songwriter, producer

Government, law and public policy
 Debo Adegbile ('91): lawyer in private practice who also serves as a Commissioner for the United States Civil Rights Commission
 Esther Batchelder (1919): nutritionist, home economist, head of Food and Nutrition division of the US Department of Agriculture
 Helen Lehman Buttenwieser ('27): lawyer, member of Lehman family
 Nina F. Elgo ('84): Judge of the Connecticut Appellate Court
 Marie L. Garibaldi ('56): Associate Justice of the Supreme Court of New Jersey
 Catherine Gregg: philanthropist and First Lady of New Hampshire (1953–1955)
 Mary Ann Handley: Connecticut State Senator
 Joanne Head: New Hampshire State Representative
 Bruce Hoffman ('76): Corporate Chair in Counterterrorism and Counterinsurgency, Director of the RAND Corporation's Washington Office, professor at Georgetown University
 Joan R. Kemler ('47): the first woman to serve as Connecticut State Treasurer (1986–87)
 Suzi Oppenheimer ('56): New York State Senator
 Erik Raven ('96), United States Under Secretary of the Navy
 Sean Spicer ('93): 30th White House Press Secretary
 Jay Stamper ('95): Democratic candidate for U.S. Senate from South Carolina
 Susan Thomases ('65): attorney, presidential adviser
 Patricia McGowan Wald ('48): U.S. Court of Appeals for the District of Columbia judge; member of International Criminal Tribunal for the Former Yugoslavia; member of the Iraq Intelligence Commission
 Kimba Wood ('66): federal judge, U.S. District Court, Southern District of New York

Business
 Tim Armstrong ('93): CEO of America Online (AOL); former Google Inc. Vice President, Advertising Sales
 Ethan Brown (?): CEO of Beyond Meat

Athletics
 Anita DeFrantz ('74): former Vice President of the International Olympic Committee, member of bronze medal U.S. women's eight-oared shell, 1976 Montreal Summer Olympics
 Jim Gabarra ('82): Olympic soccer player
 Jeff Idelson ('86): current director of the National Baseball Hall of Fame and Museum
 Rand Pecknold ('90): current head coach of the Quinnipiac University Men's Ice Hockey team
 Tim Young ('92): Olympic silver medalist in quadruple sculling
AJ Marcucci: Professional soccer player for New York Red Bulls

Other notable people associated with Connecticut College
 Katherine Bergeron: President of Connecticut College, 2014 - present
 Blanche Boyd: Professor of English and Writing
Pauline Hamilton Dederer, Professor of Biology
 Edward Harkness: Conn College benefactor, Standard Oil heir and advocate of the Harkness Table method
 Barkley Hendricks: Professor of Art
 Leo Higdon: former President of Connecticut College, 2006-2013
Carl Kimmons ('73): African American US Navy officer; first person to rise through the Navy's ranks from mess attendant to commissioned officer
 Lillian Rosanoff Lieber: mathematician and author
 William Meredith: winner of the Pulitzer Prize for poetry, and Professor of English at the college, 1955-1983
 Frederick Henry Sykes: former President of Connecticut College, 1913-1917
 William Wuyke: former Venezuelan Olympian; strength and conditioning coach

References

External links
 "Notable Alumni." Connecticut College

Connecticut College alumni